Aleksander (Alexander) Laak (24 August 1907 – 6 September 1960) was a lieutenant and the commander of the Jägala concentration camp during the German occupation of Estonia.

The estimates for the number of killed at Jägala concentration camp vary widely. The Soviet investigators reached the conclusion that 2,000–3,000 were killed in Jägala and Kalevi-Liiva taken together, but the number 5,000 (as determined by the Extraordinary State Commission in 1944) was written into the verdict.

In modern sources, the number 10,000 occurs. Some commentators have also given figures ranging from 100,000 (Michael Elkins, Jonathan Freedland) to 125,000 to 300,000 (Warren Kinsella), however, such figures contradict the findings of the Estonian International Commission for Investigation of Crimes Against Humanity and also the estimates of scholars who place the number of total Jewish victims for the Estonia of 1941–1944 at 8,500.

Aleksander Laak was also known to have arranged drunken orgies with female inmates, whom were forced to participate and then murdered afterwards.

He emigrated to Canada after World War II, in 1948. In 1960, he was implicated in the Holocaust trials in Soviet Estonia, and exposed as living as a naturalized Canadian citizen under the name of Alex Laak in suburban Winnipeg, Manitoba, Canada by the Soviet news agency TASS and Canadian journalists.

Thereafter, after reading of the arrests of Jaan Viik and Ralf Gerrets (both of whom were later convicted of crimes against humanity, sentenced to death, and executed in 1961) for mass killings of mostly Jewish East Europeans while under Nazi occupation, and being himself identified as a mass murderer, he apparently committed suicide by hanging himself in the garage of his home at the age of 53, on 6 September 1960. Prior to his death, Laak admitted to being a collaborator, but said he had nothing to do with Jägala.

It has been speculated that Laak was killed by vigilantes. Israeli journalist Michael Elkins claimed that Laak was in fact confronted one day after his wife had left their house to go to the movies, by a Jewish Avenger squad that clandestinely murdered Nazis. He was, according to Elkins, confronted with his crimes, and their intended punishment, and he accepted their offer of being allowed to commit suicide rather than be killed. An investigation of the death was reopened in 1991. Laak's friends said he killed himself to protect relatives in Canada and back in Estonia from potential reprisals.

See also
The Holocaust in Estonia
Estonian Security Police and SD

References

1907 births
1960 deaths
People from Saaremaa Parish
People from Kreis Ösel
People from Winnipeg
Holocaust perpetrators in Estonia
Estonian anti-communists
Estonian collaborators with Nazi Germany
Estonian emigrants to Canada
Soviet rapists
Nazi concentration camp commandants
Nazis who committed suicide
Suicides by hanging in Canada
Suicides in Manitoba